The Acıpayam is a breed of domesticated sheep that originated in Turkey. They are a dual-purpose breed (wool and meat). They are a mix of Awassi, Ost Fries and Daglic breeds.

Characteristics
They average 54.6kg in weight. Both have white, coarse wool.

Production 
Ewes have a mean daily milk yield of 906.2g, with a lactation period of 199 days. Lambs have an average growth rate of 83.77g/day. However, there is wide variation in production traits between individual sheep. They produce 34.7 micron wool and cut 3.1kg of greasy fleece on average. Their fleece is best suited to carpet making.

Development 
The Acipayam was developed in the 1990s in Denizli, a city in the Aegean region of Turkey, in an effort to improve production traits of local breeds. The Awassi and Daglic were chosen for their ability to withstand local conditions, and the Ost Fries for its milk yield. The genetic contribution from each of these breeds was 50% Awassi, 25% Ost Fries and 25% Daglic.

References

Sheep breeds originating in Turkey